Boscabel is a town in the Great Southern region of Western Australia located not far from Kojonup.

The town was gazetted in 1913, following a suggestion to do so by the local progress association in 1912.

It is believed that the town is named after Boscobel House in Shropshire.

References 

Great Southern (Western Australia)